John Barleycorn Must Die is the fourth studio album by English rock band Traffic, released in 1970 as Island ILPS 9116 in the United Kingdom, United Artists UAS 5504 in the United States, and as Polydor 2334 013 in Canada. It marked the band's comeback after a brief disbandment, and peaked at number 5 on the Billboard 200, making it their highest-charting album in the US, and has been certified a gold record by the RIAA. In addition, the single "Empty Pages" spent eight weeks on the Billboard Hot 100, peaking at number 74. The album was marginally less successful in the UK, reaching number 11 on the UK Albums Chart.

Background and content 
In late 1968, Traffic disbanded, with guitarist Dave Mason leaving the group for the second time prior to the completion of the Traffic album. In 1969, Steve Winwood joined the supergroup Blind Faith, while drummer and lyricist Jim Capaldi and woodwinds player Chris Wood turned to session work. Wood and Winwood also joined Blind Faith's drummer Ginger Baker in his post-Blind Faith group Ginger Baker's Air Force for their first album, Ginger Baker's Air Force (1970).

At the beginning of 1970, after the demise of Blind Faith, Winwood returned to the studio ostensibly to make his first solo album, originally to be titled Mad Shadows. He recorded two tracks with producer Guy Stevens, "Stranger to Himself" and "Every Mother's Son", but yearned for like-minded musicians to accompany, inviting Wood and Capaldi to join him. Thus Winwood's erstwhile solo album became the reunion of Traffic (minus Dave Mason), and a re-launch of the band's career. Mad Shadows would go on to be the title of Mott the Hoople's second album, also produced by Guy Stevens, and the new Winwood/Traffic album took its title from one of its tracks and became John Barleycorn Must Die.

The album featured influences from jazz and blues, but the version of the traditional English folk tune that provided the album's title, "John Barleycorn", also showed the musicians attending to a modern interpretation of traditional folk music in the vein of contemporary British bands Pentangle and Fairport Convention. Whereas previous Traffic albums had been dominated by more concise song structures, John Barleycorn saw the group develop into a looser, jam-oriented progressive rock and jazz fusion style, setting the tone for their subsequent output in the 1970s.

The album was reissued for compact disc in the UK on 1 November 1999, with five bonus tracks, including three recorded in concert from the Fillmore East in New York City. In the US, the remastered reissue of 27 February 2001 included only the two studio bonus tracks.

Steve Winwood oversaw a deluxe edition that was released on 15 March 2011, featuring the original studio album, digitally remastered on disc one, plus a second disc of bonus material, including more of the Fillmore East concert, with alternate mixes and versions of album tracks.

Cover 
The original LP release of the album had the front cover design on a background consisting of a photograph of burlap. Later LP copies had the design on a grey background. The cover is displayed prominently during a party scene in the 1971 movie by Dario Argento, Four Flies on Grey Velvet.

Reception 

Retrospective reviews of the album have been mixed. AllMusic criticised the vocal sections as "excuses for Winwood to exercise his expressive voice as punctuation to the extended instrumental sections", but made note of how the album took the band's jazz/rock leanings beyond mere jamming. Village Voice critic Robert Christgau said the departure of Mason hurt Traffic's songwriting on the album, leaving the band to depend on Winwood's "feckless improvised rock, or is it folksong-based jazz?"

It was voted number 369 in Colin Larkin's All Time Top 1000 Albums 3rd Edition (2000).

Track listing and personnel

Previously unreleased studio bonus tracks 4. ("I Just Want You To Know") and 8. ("Sittin' Here Thinkin' of My Love") are solo demos by Winwood. The live tracks, recorded on 18/19 November at the Fillmore East, comprise what was to have been side one of Live Traffic (ILPS 9142), presumably shelved in favor of Welcome to the Canteen.

Island Records 314 548 541-2, also includes the previously unreleased tracks "I Just Want You to Know" and "Sittin' Here Thinkin' of My Love".

''Tracks 4–10 recorded on 18–19 November 1970 at the Fillmore East.

Personnel 
Traffic
 Steve Winwood – acoustic piano (1, 2, 5), organ (1, 2, 3), percussion (1, 2), vocals (2-5), electric piano (3), bass guitar (3), all instruments (4), acoustic guitar (5), all other instruments (6)
 Jim Capaldi – drums (1, 2, 3, 5, 6), percussion (1, 2, 3), vocals (4, 5), tambourine (5)
 Chris Wood – percussion (1, 2, 5), saxophone (1, 2), electric saxophone (1, 2), flute (1, 2, 5), organ (3)

Production 
 Chris Blackwell – producer (1, 2, 3, 5)
 Steve Winwood – producer (1, 2, 3, 5)
 Guy Stevens – producer (4, 6)
 Brian Humphries – engineer 
 Andy Johns – engineer
 Lee Hulko – mastering 
 Mike Sida – album design
 Richard Polak – photography

Charts

References

Notes

External links 
 Official press release for John Barleycorn Must Die 2011 reissue
 Traffic – John Barleycorn Must Die (1970) album releases & credits at Discogs.com

Traffic (band) albums
1970 albums
Island Records albums
United Artists Records albums
Polydor Records albums
Albums produced by Chris Blackwell
Albums produced by Steve Winwood
Albums produced by Guy Stevens
Albums recorded at Olympic Sound Studios